Crossac is a commune in the Loire-Atlantique department in western France.

Population

See also
Communes of the Loire-Atlantique department
Parc naturel régional de Brière

References

Communes of Loire-Atlantique